Agama tassiliensis is a species of lizard in the family Agamidae. It is a small lizard found in Mali, Niger, Algeria, and Libya.

References

Agama (genus)
Reptiles described in 2011
Taxa named by Philippe Geniez
Taxa named by José Manuel Padial
Taxa named by Pierre-André Crochet